Swarg Narak is a 1978 Indian Hindi-language drama film, produced by B. Nagi Reddy under the Vijaya Productions Pvt. Ltd. banner and directed by Dasari Narayana Rao. It stars Sanjeev Kumar, Jeetendra, Vinod Mehra, Moushumi Chatterjee, Shabana Azmi  and music is composed by Rajesh Roshan. All three songs became popular. The film is a remake of the Telugu Silver Jubilee movie Swargam Narakam (1975) made by the same director.

Plot
This is the story of three couples. The first couple is that of Tripathi (Sanjeev Kumar), who always takes advantage of other's mistakes and position and earn money and his wife Mary. The second one is that of Geeta (Shabana Azmi) and Romeo Vinod (Vinod Mehra), while the jealous and possessive Shobha (Moushumi Chatterjee) and Vicky Kapoor (Jeetendra) form the third one.

The first couple is a happily married one. The second couple stays with Vinod's mother (Kamini Kaushal). Vinod spends a lot of time with Leena (Prema Narayan) and attending late night parties while Geeta patiently awaits her husband every night. Once Shobha happens to see Vicky with Radha (Tanuja), she assumes they are having an affair and pesters Vicky about it. When Vicky denies it, she leaves him. On the other hand, Vinod decides to leave the house, but destiny plays its role. He meets with an accident and during his recovery period, Geeta proves how important she is for him. He repents and completely changes into a new soft-spoken and good man. On the other hand, Shobha spoils her own relationship to such a stage that Vicky is compelled to leave his house after Radha's tragic death. At this juncture, Tripathi steps in to mend the couple. Some of the events that follow are hilarious sequences. Whether Tripathi is successful in mending these couples forms the rest of the story.

Cast

Sanjeev Kumar as Pandit Sohanlal Tripathi
Jeetendra as Mohan "Micky" Kapoor
Vinod Mehra as Vinod
Moushumi Chatterjee as Shobha Mohan Kapoor
Shabana Azmi as Geeta Vinod
Tanuja as Radha
Shobhini Singh as Mary
Madan Puri as Lala Lalchand
A. K. Hangal as Geeta's Father
Raj Mehra as Shobha's Father
Om Shivpuri as College Principal
Jagdeep as Vinod's friend
Paintal as Shambhu, Shobha's servant
Vikram Gokhale as Cinema Hall Manager
Birbal as Zaveri, Cinema Hall employee
Saleem as Student
Adil Amaan
Kamini Kaushal as Vinod's mother
Shammi as Shobha's Mother
Pandari Bai
Prema Narayan as Leena
Farita Boyce as Lily
Komilla Wirk
Baby Sumathi
Baby Gowri
Helen as Cabaret Dancer

Soundtrack

References

External links 
 

1978 films
1978 romantic drama films
Indian feminist films
Films about women in India
Indian romantic drama films
Films directed by Dasari Narayana Rao
1970s Hindi-language films
Films scored by Rajesh Roshan
Hindi remakes of Telugu films
1970s feminist films